Thikriwala  is a village in Kapurthala district of Punjab State, India. The village is administrated by a Sarpanch who is an elected representative of village.

Demography 
According to the 2011 Census of India, Thikriwala had 76 houses with the total population of 401 persons of which 216 were male and 185 female. The literacy rate was 77.84%, higher than the state average of 75.84%. The population of children in the age group 0–6 years was 31 which represented 7.73% of the total population.  Child sex ratio was approximately 550, lower than the state average of 846.

Population data

References

External links
  Villages in Kapurthala
 Kapurthala Villages List

Villages in Kapurthala district